Sae Hatakeyama (born 7 June 1999) is a Japanese BMX rider. She competed in the women's race at the 2020 Summer Olympics. On her first run, she crashed and broke her collarbone, forcing her to drop out.

References

External links
 
 
 

1998 births
Living people
BMX riders
Japanese female cyclists
Olympic cyclists of Japan
Cyclists at the 2020 Summer Olympics
Sae Hatakeyama
Cyclists at the 2018 Asian Games
Sportspeople from Kanagawa Prefecture